Scorpaenopsis crenulata, the serrated deepwater scorpionfish, is a species of venomous marine ray-finned fish belonging to the family Scorpaenidae, the scorpionfishes. This species is found in the Southwestern Pacific around Wallis and Futuna Islands.

Size

References

crenulata
Taxa named by Hiroyuki Motomura
Taxa named by Romain Causse
Fish described in 2011